Todd Snyder may refer to:
 Todd Snyder (racing driver)
 Todd Snyder (fashion designer)
 Todd Snyder (American football)

See also
 Todd Snider, American singer